The Abbot of Scone, before 1163 x 4, Prior of Scone, and then by the beginning of the 16th century, the Commendator of Scone, was the head of the community of Augustinian canons of Scone Abbey and their lands. The priory was established by King Alaxandair mac Maíl Choluim (Alexander I) sometime between 1114 and 1120, and was elevated to the status of an abbey in 1163 or 1164. The abbey was turned into a secular lordship for William Ruthven, 1st Earl of Gowrie in 1581, but was forfeited when the earl was executed in 1584, given to William Foularton in the same year, but restored to the earl's son, James Ruthven, 2nd Earl of Gowrie. An independent secular lordship was established for David Murray in 1608.

List of priors of Scone
 Robert (I), 1114 x 1120-1127
 Nicholas, 1127-1140
 Dionysius, 1140 - 1142 x 1147
 Thomas, 1150-1154
 Isaac, 1154-1162
 Robert (II), 1162

List of abbots of Scone
 Robert (II), 1163x1164-1186
 Robert (III), 1186-1198
 Reimbald, 1198-1206
 William, 1206 x 1209-1225
 Robert (IV), 1227
 Philip, 1230-1242
 Robert (V), 1240-1270
 Nicholas, 1270-1273 x
 William, 1273 x 1284
 Hugh, x 1284-1287
 Thomas de Balmerino, 1291-1312
 Henry Man, 1303-1320
 Simon, 1325-1341
 Adam de Crail, 1343-1344
 William, 1354-1370 x 1391
 Alexander, 1370 x 1391-1412 x 1417
 Alexander de Balbirnie, 1412 x 1417-x1418
 Adam de Crannach (Aberdeen), 1418-1432
 John de Inverkeithing, 1432
 William de Skurry, 1435-1439
 James Kennedy, 1439-1447
 George Gardiner, 1445-1447
 Thomas de Camera, 1447-1458
 John Crambe, 1465-1491
 David Lermonth, 1492-1496
 Henry Abercrombie, 1492
 James Abercrombie, 1492-1514

List of commendators
 Alexander Stewart de Pitcairne, 1518-1537
 Patrick Hepburn, 1538-1571
 William Lord Ruthven, 1571
 John Ruthven, 1580
 William Ruthven, 1st Earl of Gowrie, 1581-1584
 William Foularton, 1584
 James Ruthven, 2nd Earl of Gowrie, 1587-1588
 John Ruthven, 3rd Earl of Gowrie, 1592-1600
 David Murray (later Lord Scone and Viscount Stormont), 1608

Notes

Bibliography
 Cowan, Ian B. & Easson, David E., Medieval Religious Houses: Scotland With an Appendix on the Houses in the Isle of Man, Second Edition, (London, 1976), pp. 97–8
 Watt, D.E.R. & Shead, N.F. (eds.), The Heads of Religious Houses in Scotland from the 12th to the 16th Centuries, The Scottish Records Society, New Series, Volume 24, (Edinburgh, 2001), pp. 198–202

See also
 Viscount Stormont
 Stone of Scone

Canonical Augustinian abbots and priors
Scone
Scottish abbots
Abbot of Scone
1608 disestablishments in Scotland
1114 establishments in Scotland